Lady Helen Taylor (born 1964) is a member of the British Royal family, daughter of Katharine, Duchess of Kent and Prince Edward, Duke of Kent.

Helen Taylor may also refer to:

 Helen Taylor (actress) (1898–1990), sister of American actress, singer, and animal rights activist Estelle Taylor
 Helen Taylor (composer) (died 1950), wife of American concert pianist Grant Johannesen
 Helen Taylor (feminist) (1831–1907), English feminist, writer and actress
 Helen Taylor (writer) (1818–1885), English writer of books for children

See also 
 Helen Taylor Thompson (1924–2020), British aid worker